Rich Zipperer (born April 16, 1974) is a former Republican member of the Wisconsin Senate, representing the 33rd District since 2011. He previously served in the Wisconsin Assembly, representing the 98th district from 2007 through 2011.

Early life, education and career
Born in Green Bay, Wisconsin, Zipperer attended both parochial and public schools growing up, graduating from Reedsville Public High School. He graduated magna cum laude from St. Norbert College in De Pere, earned a master's degree from The George Washington University, and earned a law degree from Georgetown University Law Center. He worked for U.S. Congressman Jim Sensenbrenner as his district director and deputy chief of staff.

Wisconsin Legislature
Zipperer was first elected to the Wisconsin State Assembly in 2006.

On November 2, 2010, Zipperer was elected to the Wisconsin State Senate. In August, 2012, Zipperer resigned from the Senate to take a post as deputy chief of staff in the administration of Gov. Scott Walker.

Personal life
Zipperer met his wife, Rita, while attending St. Norbert College in De Pere. She works for Northwestern Mutual Financial Network in Brookfield. They live in Pewaukee, where they are active members of St. Anthony on the Lake Catholic Church.

Zipperer is a member of Whitetails Unlimited. He is also a member of the Pewaukee Chamber of Commerce, a board member for Bethany Christian Services Adoption Agency of Wisconsin, the Brookfield Optimists and the Waukesha County Republican Party.

References

External links
Senator Rich Zipperer at the Wisconsin State Legislature
constituency site
Rich Zipperer official campaign site
 

Politicians from Green Bay, Wisconsin
Republican Party Wisconsin state senators
Republican Party members of the Wisconsin State Assembly
1974 births
Living people
21st-century American politicians
People from Pewaukee, Wisconsin